Tirap district (Pron:/tɪˈɹæp/) is a district located in the southeastern part of the state of Arunachal Pradesh in India. It shares a state border with Assam, an international border with Myanmar and a district border with Changlang and Longding.

History 

Since time immemorial, Tirap has been inhabited by the ancestors of the indigenous tribes. Japanese troops invaded and controlled the area for a brief period in 1945, until the collapse of the Japanese Empire. After their collapse, Suman Gope came to power. Of late, Tirap has also been a major target for the NSCN, a Naga rebel group that aims for the creation of Greater Nagaland, using military force.

On 14 November 1987, Tirap was bifurcated to create the new Changlang district. In 2013 Tirap was again split to create Longding district.

Geography 
The elevation ranges from 200 meters in the northwest to 4,000 meters in the Patkai Hills. After bifurcation the district occupied an area of 1,170 square km.

Divisions 
There are four Arunachal Pradesh Legislative Assembly constituencies located in this district: Namsang, Khonsa East, Khonsa-West, Borduria-Bogapani. All of these are part of Arunachal East Lok Sabha constituency.

Demographics 
According to the 2011 census Tirap district has a population of 111,975, roughly equal to the nation of Grenada. This gives it a ranking of 613th in India (out of a total of 640). Its population growth rate over the decade 2001–2011 was 11.63%. Tirap has a sex ratio of 931 females for every 1000 males, and a literacy rate of 52.23%.

Language
Much of the tribal population consists of the Naga related Nocte, Konyak, and Wancho, who traditionally followed Animism, although most of them have converted to Christianity. Smaller communities of two other Naga tribes, Tutsa and Tangsa, besides non-Naga Singhpo can be found in the district as well. Festive fairs and festivals such as the Loku of the Nocte, Oriya, or Ojiyele of the Wancho and the Pongtu festival of the Tutsa are celebrated in full flair. Along with these festivals, Durga Puja is also celebrated here.

Religion

Education 
Among the educational institutions of Tirap district is the Ramakrishna Mission School. Christ The King ICSE School is also a famous institution in Khonsa town.

References

External links 
 Official Website

 
Districts of Arunachal Pradesh
Minority Concentrated Districts in India